Sudak (Ukrainian & Russian: Судак; ; ; sometimes spelled Sudac or Sudagh) is a town, multiple former Eastern Orthodox bishopric and double Latin Catholic titular see. It is of regional significance in Crimea, a territory recognized by most countries as part of Ukraine but annexed by Russia as the Republic of Crimea. Sudak serves as the administrative center of Sudak Municipality, one of the regions Crimea is divided into. Population: 

A city of antiquity, today it is a popular resort, best known for its Genoese fortress, the best preserved on the northern shore of the Black Sea.

History

Foundation and early Middle Ages
The date and circumstances of the city's foundation are uncertain. The first written reference to the city dates to the 7th century (in the Ravenna Cosmography), but later local tradition places its foundation in 212 CE, and archaeological evidence supports its foundation in Roman times. The city was in all likelihood founded by the Alans, as its name in Greek sources, Sougdaia is a cognate of the adjective sugda ("pure, holy") or derives from the word sugded/sogdad in the Ossetian language.

In the early Middle Ages, the city appears to have been under very loose Byzantine control, like other cities in the region. Archaeological remains indicate considerable construction activity near the shore in the 6th century. Under Byzantine influence, the city was subject to Christianization, and became the seat of a bishopric under the Patriarch of Constantinople, attested for the first time in the Second Council of Nicaea in 787. Bishop Stephen, who attended the council, was an iconophile persecuted by Emperor Constantine V. He was later canonized (St. Stephen of Surozh), and buried at the Hagia Sophia cathedral in Sougdaia, which according to later tradition was built in 793. Although a Greek-speaking population was probably settled in the city, the area remained dominated by the Alans: a 9th-century hagiography of Apostle Andrew places "Upper Sougdaia" elsewhere, between Zichia and the Cimmerian Bosporus, "in the land of the Alans", while the hagiographer of Constantine the Philosopher mentions the tribe of Sougdoi, situated between the Iberians and the Crimean Goths, which the historian Francis Dvornik identifies as the Alans.

The period between the 8th and 11th centuries is obscure, but the available evidence points to a sharp decline in Sougdaia's fortunes. Archaeological evidence shows that the 6th-century constructions were abandoned in the 8th/9th century, while later Russian legends (probably apocryphal) claim that the city was captured by the Rus' chieftain, Bravlin, at around the same time. Byzantine control lapsed, and the city probably came under Khazar suzerainty thereafter, which lasted until the early 11th century. In the early 10th century, the local see was promoted to an archbishopric.

High and late Middle Ages
The 11th–14th centuries represent a period of prosperity for the city, as shown in archaeological evidence of renewed activity both in the harbour as well as the hinterland and the area of the citadel. It became an important location for trading on the Silk Road in the 12th and 13th centuries, as a terminus for Black Sea trade. The 14th-century Arab traveller Ibn Battuta even compares its harbour with that of Alexandria. The 13th-century chronicler Ibn al-Athir writes of it as the "city of the Qifjaq from which (flow) their material possessions. It is on the Khazar Sea. Ships come to it bearing clothes. The Qifjiqs buy from them and sell them slaves. Burtas furs, beaver, squirrels ..."

By the mid-11th century, Sougdaia had returned to Byzantine control, probably following the defeat of the Khazar warlord Georgius Tzul in 1016. An inscription of 1059 mentions Leo Aliates, "strategos of Cherson and Sougdaia". By the end of the century, however, the city passed under Cuman control, which lasted until the 13th century. In  the Seljuk Turks besieged it, followed by destructive Golden Horde Tatar raids in 1223 and 1238. Finally, in  the city passed under Tatar control, although it retained considerable autonomy. Contemporary sources place its population at the time to 8,300, including Greeks, Alans, Tatars, Armenians, Latins, and Jews.

Under Tatar rule, the city was governed by the notables of the city and the 18 villages surrounding it. In the Greek sources they are mentioned by the Byzantine title sebastos, while the Latin sources use the Latinized Greek term proti ("first men"). Sometime between 1275 and 1282, the local see, which after being united with Phoulloi in the late 11th century was known as Sougdophoulloi, was raised to the status of a metropolitan see.

The city's prosperity was increased by the establishment of Venetian and Genoese commercial colonies in the Crimea during the late 13th century, but at the same time, the area was drawn into the constant disputes between these two rival cities. At about the same time, the Tatars converted to Islam, which led to a deterioration of their relations with the Greek-speaking and Christian inhabitants of the city, many of whom were forced to leave it.

As a result, on 19 July 1365, the Genoese from Kaffa seized the city, which became a Genoese trading colony. The Genoese refortified the city, constructing the citadel that is still visible today, and induced a large part of the deported Greeks to return. Genoese rule lasted until 1475, when the Ottoman Grand Vizier Gedik Ahmed Pasha captured it after a long siege.

Ottoman and modern periods

The Ottomans took control of Soldaia and all other Genoese colonies, as well as the Principality of Theodoro in 1475. Although Sudak was the strategical center of a qadılıq, the smallest administrative unit in the Ottoman Empire, the town lost much of its military and commercial importance, until the Crimean Khanate took over.

In 1771, Sudak was occupied by Rumyantsev's army. In 1783, it definitively passed to the Russian Empire, with the rest of Crimea. Though sometimes contested, it seems that a mass emigration occurred as a result of the ensuing instability in that period. Even Potemkin ordered in 1778 the eviction of the Christian population from Crimea. The town rapidly turned into a small village, and according to the 1805 census, Sudak had just 33 inhabitants.

In 1804, the first Russian school of viticulture was opened there.

The town acquired its present status in 1982.

Ecclesiastical history

Byzantine metropolis of Sougdaia 
It is unknown when the Byzantine see of Sougdaia was established, but it is attested for the first time in 787. It was in the sway of the Patriarchate of Constantinople, where it ranked 35th according to the Notitia Episcopatuum edited by Byzantine emperor Leo VI. In the 10th century it was promoted to an archbishopric. After merging with the nearby see of Phoulloi towards the end of the 11th century, it was known as Sougdophoulloi. It was raised to metropolitan status in 1275/82.

Its historical bishops were :
 St. Stephen, 787
 Constantine, in 997.

See also Russian Orthodox Diocese of Surozh for Surozh, the old name of the city as an episcopal see in the Russian Orthodox Church, which has been nominally transferred to the Russian Orthodox Diocese in Great Britain and Ireland.

Latin bishopric of Soldaia 
Under Genoese rule, a Latin Catholic diocese of Soldaia was established in 1390, which has had the following residential bishops :
 Bonifacius (19 August 1393 – ? death)
 John Greenlaw, O.F.M. (18 September 1400 – ?)
 Ludovico, O.P. (? – 15 December 1427)
 Agostino di Caffa, O.P. (23 July 1432 – ? death)
 Giovanni di Pera, O.P. (9 July 1456 – ? death)
 Leonard Wisbach, O.P. (6 October 1480 – ? death)

It was suppressed circa 1500 after the Ottoman conquest of the Crimea in 1475.

Latin titular metropolitan see of Sugdaea 
In 1933 the see was nominally restored as titular bishopric of Sugdæa (Sugdaea), which was promoted in 1948 to metropolitan titular archbishopric.

It is vacant for decades, having had a single incumbent :
 Titular Archbishop Thomas Roberts, S.J. (1950.12.04 – 1970.12.07), emeritus as former Metropolitan Archbishop of Bombay (India) (1937.08.12 – 1950.12.04).

Latin titular episcopal see of Soldaia 
In 1933 the diocese was nominally restored as a Latin Catholic titular bishopric.

It has been vacant for decades, having had a single incumbent:
 Titular Bishop José Romão Martenetz, Basilian Order of Saint Josaphat (O.S.B.M.) (1958.05.10 – 1971.11.29), as Auxiliary Bishop of Brazil of the Eastern Rite (Brazil) (1958.05.10 – 1962.05.30); succeeded as Apostolic Exarch of Brazil of the Ukrainians (Brazil) (1962.05.30 – 1971.11.29), later Eparch (Bishop) of São João Batista em Curitiba of the Ukrainians (Brazil) (1971.11.29 – 1978.03.10).

See also 
 Gazaria (Genoese colonies) - the name for Genoese communities in Crimea
 List of Catholic dioceses in Ukraine
 Roman Crimea
 Krasnokam‘yanka - Qızıltaş - Krasnokamyenka

References

Sources 
 Sugdea, Surozh, Soldaia in History and Culture of the Ruthenian Ukraine - Scientific conference materials, Kiev-Sudaq, 2002 (prints only) 
 Sugdea Collection, Kiev-Sudaq (Академпериодика, 2004) 
 Miscellaneous publications by A. Yu. Vinogradov 
 Pius Bonifacius Gams, Series episcoporum Ecclesiae Catholicae, Leipzig 1931, p. 428
 Michel Lequien, Oriens christianus in quatuor Patriarchatus digestus, Paris 1740, Vol. I, coll. 1229-1232
 Daniele Farlati-Jacopo Coleti, Illyricum Sacrum, vol. VIII, Venice 1819, p. 126
 Konrad Eubel, Hierarchia Catholica Medii Aevi, vol. 1, p. 457; vol. 2, p. 240
 (Библиотека Якова Кротова)

External links 

 GCatholic Soldaia
 GCatholic Sugdaea
 History and monuments of Sudak 
 Monastery of St. Stephen of Surozh 
 The murder of the Jews of Sudak during World War II, at Yad Vashem website.

Sudak Municipality
Cities in Crimea
Khazar towns
Populated coastal places in Ukraine
Populated coastal places in Russia
Populated places established in the 3rd century
Seaside resorts in Russia
Seaside resorts in Ukraine
Territories of the Republic of Genoa
Stato da Màr
Feodosiysky Uyezd
Cities of regional significance in Ukraine
Holocaust locations in Ukraine